Corentin Rahier (born 30 August 1998) is a French former competitive ice dancer. With his skating partner, Natacha Lagouge, he is the 2017 JGP Cup of Austria bronze medalist and 2017 French national junior champion. They finished within the top eight at the 2018 World Junior Championships.

Personal life 
Corentin Jean Théophane Rahier was born on 30 August 1998 in Lyon, France. He has Two brothers : Maximilien Rahier (born 04 February 2004) and Timothée Rahier (born 03 December 2005). He has Also one sister : Aurélie Rahier (born 14 October 2000). 
From an early age, Corentin was passionate about sports of all kinds and physical activities. He also dabbled in the field of music as he joined the Lyon Conservatory of Music where he studied the harp.
Corentin Rahier first studied at Charles De Foucault school and college until he finished his 3rd class in 2012, where he received his DNB with the mention: "very good".  Then, he arrived in the Center Scolaire Déborde in Lyon where he obtained his baccalaureate in 2015 with a mention: "very good". Upon leaving high school, Corentin joined INSA Lyon where he began a preparatory class in four years until 2019 with a sports / study course.  Thereafter, he will continue to study at the same school.

Career

Early years 
Rahier began learning to skate in 2002. He began his partnership with Hana Gassoumi by the 2010–2011 season. The following season, the two began competing internationally on the advanced novice level. Having won two national novice titles, they moved up to the junior level ahead of the 2014–2015 season but their partnership dissolved by the end of the season.

2015–2016 season 
In 2015, Muriel Zazoui suggested Natacha Lagouge as a potential partner. After a successful tryout, the skaters decided to train together in Lyon. They placed 7th at the French Junior Championships in February 2016.

2016–2017 season 
Lagouge/Rahier received two ISU Junior Grand Prix assignments; they placed 6th in Saint-Gervais-les-Bains, France, and 4th in Ljubljana, Slovenia. They were awarded the junior silver medal at the NRW Trophy and gold at the French Junior Championships. They placed 8th in the short dance, 11th in the free dance, and 11th overall at the 2017 World Junior Championships in Taipei, Taiwan.

2017–2018 season 
In September 2017, Lagouge/Rahier won the bronze medal at the ISU Junior Grand Prix in Austria. They withdrew from JGP Croatia; Lagouge fractured her hand during a practice before the short dance, competed for the first segment and finally gave up and returned to Lyon for an operation.

Programs 
(with Lagouge)

Competitive highlights 
JGP: Junior Grand Prix

With Lagouge

With Gassoumi

References

External links 
 

1998 births
French male ice dancers
Living people
Sportspeople from Lyon